Eric Dodd, known professionally as Eric Valentine, is an American record producer who began his career as drummer and producer in the heavy metal band T-Ride.

He subsequently produced albums for artists such as Good Charlotte, Lostprophets, Taking Back Sunday, Nickel Creek, Queens of the Stone Age, Third Eye Blind, Smash Mouth, The All-American Rejects, Persephone's Bees, and Slash, among others.  He is married to Grace Potter and they had a son born on January 12, 2018.

Early life 
Erics first experience with music was listening to The Monkees as a child and wanting to play drums. He received a three-piece drum set from a garage sale, leading to him taking drum lessons at the age of 9. Around that same time, Eric started listening to bands such as Led Zeppelin, AC/DC and Kiss, along with jazz fusion bands such as Weather Report from drum teachers. His father's career as an aerospace engineer was enough for him to get a four-track and learn on his own.

Discography 
 T-Ride – T-Ride (drummer/backing vocals/producer/mixing; 1992)
 The Conscious Daughters – Ear to the Street (engineer/instrumentation; 1993)
 Paris – Guerrilla Funk (engineer; 1994)
 Joe Satriani – Joe Satriani (engineer on "Luminous Flesh Giants" and "Look My Way", piano/additional engineering on "Cool #9", bass/keyboards/percussion on "Luminous Flesh Giants"; 1995)
 The Conscious Daughters – Gamers (mixing engineer; 1996)
 Dwarves – The Dwarves Are Young and Good Looking (producer/mixing/voice actor; 1997)
 Third Eye Blind – Third Eye Blind (programming on "Semi-Charmed Life" and "Motorcycle Drive By", piano on "Thanks a Lot" and "God of Wine", guitar/keyboards/programming on "I Want You", engineer/co-producer/mixing; 1997)
 Smash Mouth – Fush Yu Mang (keyboards/percussion/groovy noises/engineer/producer/mixing; 1997)
 The Braids – Here We Come (arrangements/programming/engineer/producer; 1998)
 Joe Satriani – Crystal Planet (drums/percussion/producer on "Psycho Monkey", bass/drums/keyboards/percussion/engineer/producer/mixing on "Time"; 1998)
 Brougham – "I Walked In" (mixing; 1998)
 Vital Information – Where We Come From (mixing; 1998)
 Tom Coster – From the Street (mixing; 1999)
 Smash Mouth – Astro Lounge (additional keyboards/vibraphone/engineer/producer/mixing; 1999)
 Citizen King – Mobile Estates (engineer/producer/mixing; 1999)
 Snake River Conspiracy – Sonic Jihad (producer; 2000)
 Dwarves – Come Clean (engineer/producer/mixing; 2000)
 Deathray – Deathray (synthesizer/keyboards/producer; 2000)
 Smash Mouth – Smash Mouth (writer on "She Turns Me On", engineer/producer/mixing; 2001)
 Scapegoat Wax – Okeeblow (engineer/producer/mixing on "Space to Share" and "Perfect Silence", writer on "Perfect Silence"; 2001)
 Queens of the Stone Age – Songs for the Deaf (producer except "The Sky Is Fallin'" and "Do It Again"; 2002)
 Good Charlotte – The Young and the Hopeless (writer on "A New Beginning", string arrangement/engineer/producer/mixing; 2002)
 Kelly Osbourne – "Papa Don't Preach" (producer; 2002)
 Lostprophets – Start Something (engineer/producer/mixing; 2004)
 John Fogerty – Deja Vu All Over Again (mixing/additional parts on "She's Got Baggage"; 2004)
 Good Charlotte – The Chronicles of Life and Death (writer on "Once Upon a Time: The Battle of Life and Death", string arrangement/mastering/engineer/producer/mixing; 2004)
 Dwarves – The Dwarves Must Die (engineer/producer/mixing; 2004)
 Skye Sweetnam – Noise from the Basement (writer on "Number One"; 2004)
 Nickel Creek – Why Should the Fire Die? (mastering/engineer/producer/mixing; 2005)
 Aslyn – Lemon Love (producer on "Be the Girl", "493-1023", "Ain't No Love", and "You Got Me"; 2005)
 Taking Back Sunday – Louder Now (engineer/producer/mixing; 2006)
 Smash Mouth – Summer Girl (engineer/producer/mixing on "So Insane", "Story of My Life", and "Right Side, Wrong Bed", drum producer/mixing for "Everyday Superhero", vocal producer for "Quality Control"; 2006)
 Mellowdrone – Box (engineer on "Oh My", "Four Leaf Clover", "Fashionably Uninvited", "Fuck It Man", and "Whatever the Deal"; 2006)
 Persephone's Bees – Notes from the Underworld (drums/mastering/engineer/producer/mixing; 2006)
 Aqualung – Memory Man (additional production/mixing; 2007)
 Hot Hot Heat – Happiness Ltd. (producer/mixing on "5 Times Out of 100"; 2007)
 Maroon 5 – It Won't Be Soon Before Long (engineer/producer/mixing on "Little of Your Time" and "Can't Stop"; 2007)
 Jesca Hoop – Kismet (additional engineering; 2007)
 The All-American Rejects – When the World Comes Down  (drum corp/orchestration composer on "Real World", programming/engineer/producer/mixing; 2008)
 Tracy Hamlin – Better Days (instruments/engineer/producer on "Free"; 2009)
 Jackiem Joyner – Lil' Man Soul (drums on "Take Me There"; 2009)
 Theo Tams – Give It All Away (writer on "Wait for You"; 2009)
 Slash – Slash (piano on "Ghost", keyboards on "I Hold On", engineer/producer/mixing; 2010)
 Steve Lukather – All's Well That Ends Well (writer on "Tumescent (Instrumental)", drums; 2010)
 Chris Standring – Blue Bolero (drums on "Please Mind the Gap" and "March of the Bowler Hats"; 2011)
 Taking Back Sunday – Taking Back Sunday (engineer/producer/mixing; 2011)
 Dwarves – The Dwarves Are Born Again (editor/mastering/engineer/mixing; 2011)
 The Wombats – This Modern Glitch (engineer/producer/mixing on "Tokyo (Vampires & Wolves)" and "1996", vocals on "1996", additional production/engineer on "Techno Fan"; 2011)
 Slash – Apocalyptic Love (writer on "No More Heroes", producer; 2012)
 Smash Mouth – Magic (engineer/producer/mixing on "Don't You (Forget About Me)"; 2012)
 Steve Lukather – Transition (drums on "Last Man Standing", "Do I Stand Alone", and "Rest of the World"; 2013)
 Blag Dahlia – "Metrosexual Man" (drums/vocals on "Metrosexual Man", mixing on "Metrosexual Man" and "The Simple Life"; 2013)
 Dwarves – The Dwarves Invented Rock & Roll (mastering; 2014)
 Nickel Creek – A Dotted Line (percussion/mastering/engineer/producer/mixing; 2014)
 5 Seconds of Summer – 5 Seconds of Summer (mastering/additional production/mixing on "She Looks So Perfect"; 2014)
 The Madden Brothers – Greetings from California (producer on side A; 2014)
 Supersuckers – Get the Hell (mastering; 2014)
 Nightmare and the Cat – Simple (mastering/engineer/producer/mixing; 2014)
 5 Seconds of Summer – Sounds Good Feels Good (mastering/mixing; 2015)
 The Wombats – Glitterbug (engineer/producer; 2015)
 Grace Potter – Midnight (producer/mixing; 2015)
 Richard Elliot – Summer Madness (drums; 2016)
 Peter White – Groovin''' (drums on "When Will I See You Again"; 2016)
 Good Charlotte – Youth Authority (mixing on "Makeshift Love"; 2016)
 Grace VanderWaal – Perfectly Imperfect (mastering; 2016)
 Gwen Stefani – You Make It Feel Like Christmas (editing/engineer/lap steel guitar/percussion/producer; 2017)
Death from Above 1979 – Outrage! Is Now (producer; 2017)
Weezer – Pacific Daydream (mixing on "Mexican Fender", "Beach Boys" and tracks 4-10/mastering; 2017)
The Story So Far – Proper Dose'' (mixing; 2018)

See also 
 :Category:Albums produced by Eric Valentine

References

External links 
 BareFoot Recording, Valentine's studio

Living people
American record producers
Place of birth missing (living people)
Year of birth missing (living people)